David B. Smith (b. 1977, Washington, D.C.) is a multi-disciplinary artist, who works in fabric-based photo-sculpture, sound and performance. He lives in Brooklyn, NY.

Early life 
Born and raised in Washington D.C., Smith attended Oberlin College and graduated with a BA in Art History in 1999. The following year he moved to Chicago, and relocated to New York in 2001. He received an MFA in Photography from Bard College in 2007.

Career 
Smith’s work has appeared in exhibitions at MoMa PS1, The International Center of Photography, Asia Song Society, Johannes Vogt Gallery, Essex Flowers, 56 Henry Gallery, The Spring / Break Art Show, and the 2008 Beijing Triennial. He has been a Visiting Artist at Cooper Union, NYU ITP Program and ICP/Bard College, and taught at Pratt Institute and SUNY Old Westbury. In 2019, his work was part of the Textile Biennial at the Rijswijk Museum in the Netherlands. His work has been discussed in The Observer, Art Fag City, VICE, Time Out New York, The Washington Post, and in the New York Times.

Influences 
Textiles, soft sculpture and folk art practices influence Smith’s works, and he often blends these forms within a single piece. Speculative fiction and comic book narratives are a lens through which Smith creates, and his works imagine future worlds, creatures, and societies as a way to envision decolonized space and reinvestigate notions of race, climate change and alternate states of consciousness.  

Smith writes:“Sci-fi narratives are very compelling to me - imagining stories and persons, objects and creatures from other planets, VR realities, or star systems. Digital technologies and image gathering help reveal these worlds and continue a line of artistic questioning and layering until I get work that exists in a 3D - an interactive and physically relational element, creating viewer interconnectivity....revealing worlds and selves that might be hidden beneath historical and preconceived notions of what something is to invite the question of what something could be.”

Creation process 
For Smith, every object, person or memory is informed by a cultural landscape, made of images, lived experiences, memories, gestures, and sound. He playfully offers the range of possibility within these experiences by bending, folding, and layering textiles with digital, sonic, found, and created images. The resulting works are referential and unfamiliar, creating a discombobulating effect for the viewer, whether a soft sculpture, a sound score or a performance.

Collections 

Peggy Cooper Cafritz
 Beth Rudin DeWoody
Yale University

Residencies 

 Textiles Arts Center, New York, NY, 2019
 Marble House Project, Dorset, VT, 2018
 Socrates Sculpture Park, Queens, NY, 2017
 Franconia Sculpture Park, Shafer, MN, 2016
 Apex Art International Fellow, New Zealand, 2015

Solo exhibitions 

 Cloudminders, Geary Contemporary, NY, 2019
 Cave Dwellers, Spring / Break Art Fair, NY, 2019 
 Soft Bodies, Halsey McKay Gallery, East Hampton, 2018
 Under the Surface, LMAK Gallery, New York, NY, 2018
 Sampler, Planthouse Gallery, New York, NY, 2018
 The Unseen, Halsey McKay Gallery, NY, NY, 2016
 Extruded Daydream, Spring / Break Art Show, NY, 2016
 Seeing Backwards, Calico Gallery, Brooklyn, NY, 2015

Group exhibitions 

 Textile Biennial, Museum Rijswijk, Netherlands, 2019
 Psychedelic Healing Center, Essex Flowers, New York, NY, 2019
 The Socrates Annual, Socrates Sculpture Park, Queens, NY, 2017
 In Search of Lost Time, International Center of Photography, Manhattan, NY, 2017
 Thread by Thread, LMAK Gallery, New York, NY 2017
 Olympia’s Eyes, Zevitas Marcus Gallery, Los Angeles, CA, 2016
 Mi Casa, Tu Casa, Johannes Vogt Gallery, New York, 2016
 reMap 4, Athens, Greece, 2013
 Fuel for the Fire, Zwirner Gallery, New York, NY, 2012
 Fall Collection, MoMa PS1, Queens, New York, 2009
 Waterways, Venice, Italy, 2005

Art fairs 

 NADA Miami, Halsey McKay Gallery, 2019
 Dallas Art Fair, Halsey McKay Gallery, 2017
 Art Brussels, Johannes Vogt Gallery, 2016

References 

1977 births
Living people
American contemporary artists
Artists from Washington, D.C.